The Minden Coalfield is located in the northern Wiehen foothills near the German town of Minden. Here, seams of Wealden Coal (Wealdenkohle) reach the surface of the earth in the Schaumburg Basin (Schaumburger Mulde). During the Thirty Years' War Swedish soldiers first discovered this black coal near Minden whilst preparing fieldworks on the Bölhorst. By 1663 it was forbidden to dig privately for coal and severe penalties were imposed for doing so. 

A series of shaft systems were sunk increasingly deeper into the earth. Coal continued to be mined until 1 August 1958, for example in the Barsinghausen coalfield (Barsinghausener Revier) east of Minden in the Deister. The last mine in this coalfield was the Minden Coal Mine (Kohlenbergwerk Minden) in Meißen.

Geology 

Below the Lower Shale are layers of Malm. The well-sealed shale results in the low water ingress from the hill range, but a high level of mine gas:  of firedamp (CH4) per ton of coal. 

The beds descend steadily at an incline of 20 - 22° towards the north. Two large faults were discovered in the course of coal mining: The Rösche Fault (Rösche-Sprung) and the Porta Fault (Porta-Verwerfung). 
In the Lower Wealden Shale there are two coal seams.

The main seam was abandoned in later years due to its lack of workability. The coal in the secondary seam has 22% volatile components and is categories as bituminous coal, low in gas. Its calorific value is 7,600 kcal/kg with a sulphur content of 8-9% as a result of iron sulphide.

Sources 
 Hans Röhrs: Erz und Kohle. Bergbau und Eisenhütten zwischen Ems und Weser. Ibbenbürener Vereinsdruckerei (IVD), Ibbenbüren 1992, 263 pp., 
 Thomas Krassmann: ''Materialien zur Geologie und zum Bergbau des Schaumburger Landes 2010

External links 

 
 Thomas Krassmann: Materialien zur Geologie und zum Bergbau des Schaumburger Landes

Industrial history of Germany
Economy of North Rhine-Westphalia
Minden-Lübbecke
Min
History of mining in Germany